Reveille, also known as the Brick House, is a historic home located in Richmond, Virginia.  The house consists of three sections.  The main -story house dates to about 1806; the -story
west wing dates to 1839; and a rear kitchen wing was added to the west wing in 1920.  The house is an example of an early 19th-century Federal style country residence. In 1950 the property and house were acquired by the Reveille United Methodist Church.

It was listed on the National Register of Historic Places in 1979.

References

External links
Reveille United Methodist Church website

Houses on the National Register of Historic Places in Virginia
Federal architecture in Virginia
Houses completed in 1806
Houses in Richmond, Virginia
National Register of Historic Places in Richmond, Virginia